Earlswood railway station may refer to:

Earlswood railway station (Surrey), in Earlswood, Surrey, England
Earlswood railway station (West Midlands), near Earlswood, West Midlands, England